NGC 3308 is a lenticular galaxy with a faint bar located about 174 million light-years away in the constellation Hydra.  NGC 3308 was discovered by astronomer John Herschel on March 24, 1835. It is a member of the Hydra Cluster.

See also 
 List of NGC objects (3001–4000)
 M85

References

External links

Hydra Cluster
Hydra (constellation)
Lenticular galaxies
3308 
31438 
Astronomical objects discovered in 1835